Dafo may refer to:

 Edith Woodford-Grimes (1887–1975), English Wiccan
 DAFO (Dynamic Ankle Foot Orthosis), a brand name for some lower extremity braces that provide thin, flexible, external support to the foot, ankle and/or lower leg
 Leshan Giant Buddha, or Leshan Dafo, in Sichuan, China

See also
Dafo Temple (disambiguation), several temples in China